Erick Torres may refer to:

 Erick Torres (footballer, born 1975), Peruvian footballer
 Erick Torres (footballer, born 1993), Mexican forward
 Erick Torres (footballer, born 2001), Peruvian footballer